Prance is a surname. Notable people with the surname include:

 Bertram Prance (1889–1958), British artist and illustrator
 George Prance (1827–1885), sailor in the U.S. Navy during the American Civil War
 Ghillean Prance (born 1937), British botanist and ecologist
 Miles Prance (fl. 1678), English Roman Catholic craftsman